A Handful of Dust are a New Zealand free noise band featuring guitarist Bruce Russell, violinist Alastair Galbraith and drummer Peter Stapleton.

Discography

New Zealand musical groups